Edgard De Caluwé (1 July 1913 in Denderwindeke – 16 May 1985 in Geraardsbergen) was a Belgian cyclist.

He had twenty victories as a professional from 1933 to 1947. He won the Paris-Brussels and Bordeaux-Paris in 1935. He finished second in the Tour of Flanders in 1936 and won it in 1938. He had already won the Tour of Flanders in 1933, but as an independent.

His career was interrupted by World War II. He also won some victories after the war, but his best years were before it.

He also participated in the Tour de France twice, without much success.

The Grote Prijs Beeckman-De Caluwé in Ninove has been named after him.

Major results

Source:

1935
Paris-Brussels
Bordeaux-Paris

1937
7th of Paris–Roubaix

1938
Tour of Flanders

1945
Ninove

Results in the Tour de France
1934: DNF
1935: DNF

References

1913 births
1985 deaths
Belgian male cyclists
People from Ninove
Cyclists from East Flanders